See How They Run is a 2006 Thai supernatural comedy horror film directed by . Within four days from its release on 3 August 2006, it was able to earn ฿27.8 million, edging out other films such as Loveaholic, Miami Vice, The Lake House and Sad Movie.

Cast and characters 
Below are the cast of the series:

 Jaturong Mokjok
 Prasittichoke Manasantadchart
 
 Chamon Tantanasiriwong
 
 
 Kom Chauncheun
 
 
 Patcharee Na Nakorn

References

External links
 

2006 films
2006 horror films
2006 comedy films
2000s ghost films
GMM Tai Hub films
Thai-language films
2006 comedy horror films
Thai comedy horror films
Thai ghost films